The Longtailed sand-eel (Bascanichthys kirkii) is an eel in the family Ophichthidae (worm/snake eels). It was described by Albert Günther in 1870, originally under the genus Ophichthys. It is a marine, tropical eel, which is known from Aden to Natal, South Africa, in the western Indian Ocean.

References

Ophichthidae
Fish described in 1870
Taxa named by Albert Günther